The following tables list notable software packages that are nominal IDEs; standalone tools such as source code editors and GUI builders are not included. These IDEs are listed in alphabetical order of the supported language.

ActionScript

Ada

Assembly

BASIC

C/C++

C#

COBOL

Common Lisp

Component Pascal

D

Eiffel

Erlang 

Go to this page: Source code editors for Erlang

Fortran

F#

Groovy

Haskell

Haxe 

Go to this page: Comparison of IDE choices for Haxe programmers

Java 

Java has strong IDE support, due not only to its historical and economic importance, but also due to a combination of reflection and static-typing making it well-suited for IDE support.
Some of the leading Java IDEs (such as IntelliJ and Eclipse) are also the basis for leading IDEs in other programming languages (e.g. for Python, IntelliJ is rebranded as PyCharm, and Eclipse has the PyDev plugin.)

Open

Closed

JavaScript

Julia

Lua

Pascal, Object Pascal

Perl

PHP

Python

R

Racket

Ruby

Scala

Smalltalk

Tcl

Unclassified 
 IBM Rational Business Developer
 Mule (software)

Visual Basic .NET

See also 
 Comparison of assemblers
 Graphical user interface builder
 List of compilers
 Source-code editor
 Game integrated development environment

References 

Integrated development environments